Sunlight's Last Raid is a 1917 American silent Western film directed by William Wolbert and starring Gayne Whitman, Mary Anderson and Vincente Howard.

Cast
 Mary Anderson as Janet Warned
 Gayne Whitman as Jack Conway 
 Vincente Howard as Captain Sunlight 
 Fred Burns as Bill Warned
 Al Ernest Garcia as Pedro

References

Bibliography
 John T. Weaver. Twenty Years of Silents, 1908-1928. Scarecrow Press, 1971.

External links
 

1917 films
1917 Western (genre) films
American black-and-white films
Vitagraph Studios films
Films directed by William Wolbert
Silent American Western (genre) films
1910s English-language films
1910s American films